SF  may refer to:

Locations
 San Francisco, California, United States
 Sidi Fredj, Algeria
 South Florida, an urban region in the United States
 Suomi Finland, former vehicular country code for Finland

In arts and entertainment

Genres
 Speculative fiction (usually sf)
 Science fiction or sci-fi (usually SF)

In film and television 
 , the Swedish film industry
 SF Film Finland, a Finnish film distributor
 SF Channel (Australia)
 , a German-language television network in Switzerland
 , a Finnish film production company

In music 
 Sforzando (musical direction) or sf, a musical accent
 Subito forte, a musical notation for dynamics (music)
 Switchfoot, a band
 Sasha Fierce, on-stage alter ego of American entertainer Beyoncé, and namesake of her album I Am... Sasha Fierce

Other media 
 Saikoro Fiction, a Japanese role-playing game system
 Street Fighter, a series of fighting video games by Capcom

Businesses and organizations

In politics 
 Salzburg Forum, European security intergovernmental organization
 Sinn Féin, an Irish political party
 , a political party in Denmark
 , a splinter group of the Norwegian Labour Party

Other businesses and organizations
 , a type of Norwegian state enterprise
 SF Express, a Chinese multinational delivery services and logistics company
 SF Airlines, a Chinese cargo airline owned by SF Express
 Salesforce, an American cloud computing company specializing in customer resource management
 SourceForge, a web-based service that offers a source code repository, download mirrors, bug tracking and other features
 Space forces, military service branches for space operations
 Special forces, military units trained to perform unconventional missions
 State Farm, an American insurance company
 Tassili Airlines (IATA designator SF)
 Six Flags
 A common shorthand for "Standard Form", a designation used by the United States Office of Personnel Management for forms used across various government agencies

In science, math, and engineering  
 Significant figures, numeric digits contributing meaningfully to measurement resolution
 Safety factor, the capacity of a system beyond expected or actual loads
 Spontaneous fission, a form of radioactive decay found in very heavy elements
 Square foot, unit of area
 Stacking fault, a dislocation in a crystal
 S.F., an acronym name for stick figures

In sports 
 A common abbreviation for the U.S. city of San Francisco, California's major professional sports teams:
 San Francisco 49ers, the city's National Football League team
 San Francisco Giants, the city's Major League Baseball team
 Small forward, a position in basketball
 Stade Français, a French rugby union team based in Paris
 Superleague Formula, a former motorsport racing series
 Super Formula Championship, a Japanese motorsport racing series
 Sacrifice fly, a play in baseball
 Semi-finals, a round in elimination tournaments
 Scuderia Ferrari, an Italian Formula One team

Other uses 
 San Francisco (sans-serif typeface), Apple's sans-serif and corporate typeface
 United States Air Force Security Forces, the ground combat, force protection and military police force of the U.S. Air Force
 United States Army Special Forces, special operations organization of the U.S. Army 
 , a French breed of horse
 A former hull classification symbol for a fleet submarine in the United States Navy

See also
 Garland SF-01 and Garland SF-03, fictional racing cars in Future GPX Cyber Formula